Cristián Samper (born September 25, 1965) is a Colombian-American tropical biologist specializing in conservation biology and environmental policy. He is the Managing Director and Leader of Nature Solutions at the Bezos Earth Fund. He served as President and CEO of WCS (Wildlife Conservation Society) from 2012 to 2022. He was the Director of the Smithsonian Institution's National Museum of Natural History, the world's largest natural history collection, from 2003 to 2012, and served as acting Secretary of the Smithsonian from 2007 to 2008, the first Latin American to hold the position. In April 2015, Dr. Samper was inducted into the American Academy of Arts and Sciences.

Early life and education
Samper was born on September 25, 1965 in San José, Costa Rica, the youngest child of Armando Samper Gnecco, an agronomist and economist from Colombia, and Jean Kutschbach, an American from New York State. He was raised in Colombia, the country of his father, from one year of age and spent part of his childhood in Chile. His other siblings are Marta, Belén, and Mario.

Samper graduated in 1987 from the University of the Andes in Bogotá, Colombia, with a B.Sc. in Biology. He then moved to the United States to attend Harvard University, where he graduated in 1989 with a M.Sc., and received his Ph.D. in Biology in 1992 with his dissertation Natural disturbance and plant establishment in an Andean cloud forest.

Career
Back in Colombia, Samper collaborated in the creation of the Colombian Ministry of Environment and the National Environmental System in 1993 and was successful in establishing the Alexander von Humboldt Biological Resources Research Institute, a public funded research institute of which he became its first Director from 1995 to 2001. He led the Colombian delegation to the United Nations Convention on Biological Diversity, and served as Chairman of the Subsidiary Body of Scientific, Technical, and Technological Advice (SBSTTA) from 1999 to 2001. He was one of the lead authors of the Millennium Ecosystem Assessment and led the adoption of the Global Strategy for Plant Conservation. 

As Director of the Humboldt Institute, he was responsible for the second largest biodiversity collection in Colombia, established a network of biological collections, and supported the creation of a network of biological gardens. He also supported biodiversity expeditions across the country, and the creation of the first biodiversity tissue bank in the country. He drafted the National Biodiversity Strategy and Action Plan for Colombia to the United Nations Convention on Biological Diversity.

At the Smithsonian 
He was recruited to serve as Deputy Director and staff scientist at the Smithsonian Tropical Research Institute in Panama in 2001, and became the Director of the Smithsonian Institution's National Museum of Natural History in Washington, D.C. in 2003. During his tenure at the Smithsonian, he raised more than $300 million in private philanthropy. While leading the National Museum of Natural History, Samper shepherded many new programs, improved business practices, and completed facility and exhibit additions and upgrades. In 2008, the museum launched the Encyclopedia of Life, a web-based global partnership to provide on-line access to knowledge about life on Earth. In addition, Samper developed the Recovering Voices initiative, aimed at working with indigenous communities to document, preserve, and revive endangered languages and cultural traditions. Some of the important renovations under Samper's leadership included the Behring Family Hall of Mammals (2003); the Butterfly Pavilion (2007); the Sant Ocean Hall (2008); the David H. Koch Hall of Human Origins (2010); and the Q?rius Education Center (2013).

Other important improvements led by Samper were the upgrading of collections storage facilities, including a $100 million expansion and renovation of the Museum Support Center; a state-of-the-art collections facility; and expansion of digitization of collections. A major interest of Samper has been efforts to mentor and guide the development of future leaders and scientists. While at the museum he developed a succession plan for research scientists, including a major recruitment of the next generation of scientists across the Museum, and established the Buck Fellowship Program to train the next generation of scientists.

In 2006, he made some controversial changes to an exhibit at the National Museum of Natural History on the Arctic National Wildlife Refuge, "Seasons of Life and Land". Following the resignation of Secretary Lawrence M. Small in the wake of inquiries into personal expenditures, the Board of Regents appointed Samper as the Smithsonian's Acting Secretary in 2007 and 2008. He returned to the museum in July 2008 upon the appointment of G. Wayne Clough. In July 2012, he stepped down from the directorship of the museum to assume the position of president and CEO of WCS (Wildlife Conservation Society).

At WCS
Samper served as President and CEO of the Wildlife Conservation Society (WCS) for a decade from 2012 to 2022, where he oversaw the world's largest collection of urban parks—including the Bronx Zoo, New York Aquarium, Central Park Zoo, Queens Zoo, and Prospect Park Zoo—and a global conservation program in 60 countries and across all the world's oceans. He forged partnerships with NGOs, foundations, governments, and zoos and aquariums in the United States and across the world to address a range of conservation issues, including ending elephant poaching and all illegal wildlife trade and advancing nature-based solutions to climate change.

During his tenure leading WCS, Samper has helped the organization to pursue its conservation mission on many fronts—both at its New York City parks and in its field work across the globe. He led a $350 million reconstruction and expansion of the New York Aquarium following its destruction by Hurricane Sandy, including a new award-winning exhibit, Ocean Wonders: Sharks!, which features the science and conservation work in the nearby Hudson River Canyon. 

Samper is a leading champion of the role of zoological parks in educating the public and inspiring them to protect wildlife and wild places. With more than 200 million visitors every year, Association of Zoos and Aquariums (AZA) institutions are in a unique position to connect people to nature and solve problems like wildlife trafficking and climate change. Addressing the Association of Zoos and Aquariums as the keynote speaker at its annual meeting in 2014, Samper noted: "All the zoos and aquariums -- the AZA members – have more than almost 3,000 conservation projects that are happening right now as we speak. And they take place in a hundred and twenty-seven countries and every one of them is starting to make a difference. Together, we as a community are investing $160,000,000 a year in field conservation. That is larger than the budget of most of the other conservation groups in this country and makes AZA one of the largest investors in field conservation."

In 2013, WCS took the lead in bringing together African elephant range states, fellow conservation NGOs, government leaders, and the Clinton Global Initiative for a multi-year commitment to stop the killing, stop the trafficking, and stop the demand for elephant ivory. Samper was named to President Obama's Advisory Council on Wildlife Trafficking the same year. WCS created and led the 96 Elephants Campaign, which helped spark actions in the U.S. and around the globe to save elephants—including state ivory bans in New York, New Jersey, California, and Washington, as well as in China and Europe.

The WCS 2030 strategy builds on this vision, and includes bold initiatives to build a global network of Nature's Strongholds to save the most important places for biodiversity; the protection of intact forests to help solve the climate crisis; and a One Health initiative to promote the link between wildlife and human health, with the goal of preventing future pandemics. It also includes an initiative to use the Bronx Zoo as a gateway for conservation and education, while expanding the use of digital tools to connect a global audience to wildlife.

During his tenure, WCS adopted a Code of Conduct, established a Diversity, Equity, and Inclusion (DEI) Council and plan, created a regional structure for its global conservation programs, doubled the number of peer-reviewed publications, and expanded digital outreach programs. During this time, WCS doubled the annual fundraising from private donors, expanded grants from European and multilateral donors, and invested more than $1.5 billion for its field conservation programs globally. 

In July 2020, Samper issued a public apology for the treatment of Ota Benga, a young Central African from the Mbuti people of present-day Democratic Republic of Congo who was exhibited at the St. Louis World's Fair and later displayed at the Bronx Zoo.

Bezos Earth Fund
Samper joined the Bezos Earth Fund as Principal Advisor in 2021, and became its Managing Director and Leader of Nature Solutions in 2022. He is responsible for a grants portfolio that includes the protection and restoration of nature, as well as the transformation of food systems. He designed and leads the Protecting Our Planet Challenge, a coalition of private foundations that pledged to invest $5 billion to protect 30 percent of the planet by 2030, the single largest pledge for nature conservation.

Affiliations and Honors
Samper currently serves on the boards of the Carnegie Institution for Science, the New York Botanical Garden, the Joyce Foundation, and the Summit Foundation.  He also serves on the advisory boards of the Stanford Woods Institute, the Wilson Center, and the Explora Museum in Colombia. He previously served on the Harvard Board of Overseers and the boards of the American Association of Museums, the World Wide Fund for Nature (WWF), and The Nature Conservancy (TNC); the Scientific and Technical Advisory Panel (STAP) of the Global Environment Facility (GEF); and the IUCN Species Survival Commission.

The Smithsonian Board of Regents created the Gold Medal for Exceptional Service and Samper was its first recipient in 2008, and he was also awarded the Joseph Henry Medal when he left the Smithsonian in 2012.

Colombian President Juan Manuel Santos presented Samper with the prestigious Order of San Carlos in September  2014 for his contributions to the conservation of biodiversity and environmental policy, and he served on the "Mision de Sabios" for the government of Colombia in 2018. 

In April 2015, Dr. Samper was inducted into the American Academy of Arts and Sciences, and he is also a member of the Columbian Academy of Sciences, the Academy of Sciences for the Developing World, and the Council on Foreign Relations.

Personal life
In 2002 Samper married Adriana Casas Isaza, an environmental lawyer from Colombia with whom he has two children, Carolina (b. 2006) and Martín (b. 2009). They established the Colombia Biodiversa Fund with the Fundacion Alejandro Angel Escobar to provide fellowships for university students doing research on biodiversity. He belongs to an influential Colombian family of politicians, entrepreneurs, and intellectuals that includes former Colombian president Ernesto Samper, who is his cousin.

References

External links
"A Conversation With: Cristián Samper; A Fascination With Forests Finds Fulfillment at Smithsonian", The New York Times, Alicia Ault, June 17, 2003
"Luncheon Cristián Samper Acting Secretary Smithsonian", The National Press Club, October 22, 2007
'Martha's Legacy: The past, present and future of species, ecosystems and human livelihoods," a keynote speech at the 2012 IUCN World Conservation Congress in Jeju, South Korea, WCS, September 6, 2012
"Cristián Samper Delivers Keynote at AZA Annual Meeting", WCS Youtube Channel, September 16, 2014
"Earth Day: How the Colombian Jungle Inspired a Latino Conservationst," NBC News, April 22, 2016
Cristián Samper Huffington Post Blog, Huffington Post
"Five Transformative Actions," World Wildlife Day Remarks by WCS President and CEO Cristián Samper, United Nations, March 3, 2020
Racist Incident From Zoo’s Past Draws Apology, New York Times, July 29, 2020
Statement by Wildlife Conservation Society President and CEO Cristián Samper, One Planet Summit, January 11, 2021 
Private Funders of the New ‘Protecting Our Planet Challenge’ Announce $5 Billion Commitment to Protect and Conserve 30% of Planet by 2030, Bloomberg Philanthropies, Sept. 22, 2021 
Achieving a Nature Positive Future, An Interview with Cristián Samper, Mongabay, Nov. 3, 2021 
Samper Steps Down at WCS After Ten Years and Joins Bezos Earth Fund, WCS Newsroom, May 10, 2022 
Samper Heads to Bezos Earth Fund from WCS, Mongabay, May 11, 2022 
WCS Welcomes Protecting Our Planet Challenge to Protect the World’s Oceans, WCS Newsroom, June 28, 2022 

1965 births
People from San José, Costa Rica
Living people
Cristian
Costa Rican people of Colombian descent
University of Los Andes (Colombia) alumni
Harvard University alumni
Secretaries of the Smithsonian Institution
Colombian emigrants to the United States
Costa Rican biologists
21st-century American biologists
Smithsonian Institution people